Cuba competed at the 1980 Summer Olympics in Moscow, Soviet Union. 207 competitors, 175 men and 32 women, took part in 92 events in 19 sports.

Medalists

Gold
María Caridad Colón — Athletics, Women's Javelin Throw
Juan Hernández — Boxing, Men's Bantamweight
Ángel Herrera — Boxing, Men's Lightweight
Andrés Aldama — Boxing, Men's Welterweight
Armando Martínez — Boxing, Men's Light Middleweight
José Gómez Mustelier — Boxing, Men's Middleweight
Teófilo Stevenson — Boxing, Men's Heavyweight
Daniel Núñez — Weightlifting, Men's Bantamweight

Silver
Silvio Leonard — Athletics, Men's 100 metres
Alejandro Casañas — Athletics, Men's 110 metres Hurdles
Hipólito Ramos — Boxing, Men's Light Flyweight 
Adolfo Horta — Boxing, Men's Featherweight
Jose Rodríguez — Judo, Men's Extra Lightweight (60 kg)
Juan Ferrer — Judo, Men's Half Middleweight (78 kg)
Isaac Azcuy — Judo, Men's Middleweight (86 kg)

Bronze
Luis Delis — Athletics, Men's Discus Throw
José Aguilar — Boxing, Men's Light Welterweight 
Ricardo Rojas — Boxing, Men's Light Heavyweight
Roberto Castrillo — Shooting, Men's Skeet Shooting
Alberto Blanco — Weightlifting, Men's 100 kg

Athletics

Men's 100 metres
Silvio Leonard
 Heat — 10.33
 Quarterfinals — 10.16 
 Semifinals — 10.40 
 Final — 10.25 (→  Silver Medal)
Osvaldo Lara
 Heat — 10.39
 Quarterfinals — 10.21 
 Semifinals — 10.34 
 Final — 10.43 (→ 5th place)
Tomás González
 Heat — 10.65
 Quarterfinals — 10.44 (→ did not advance)

Men's 200 metres
Silvio Leonard  
Osvaldo Lara
Tomás González

Men's 400 metres
Alberto Juantorena

Men's Marathon
 Radamés González
 Final — did not finish (→ no ranking)

Men's 110 m Hurdles
 Alejandro Casañas
 Heat — 13.46
 Semifinals — 13.44
 Final — 13.40 (→  Silver  Medal)

Men's 4×100 metres Relay
Osvaldo Lara, Alejandro Casañas, Silvio Leonard, and Tomás González

Men's High Jump
Francisco Centelles
 Qualification — 2.10 m (→ did not advance)

Men's Long Jump
 David Giralt
 Qualification — 7.57 m (→ did not advance)

Men's Triple Jump
Armando Herrera
 Qualification — 16.49 m
 Final — 15.90 m (→ 11th place)
Alejandro Herrera
 Qualification — no mark (→ no ranking)

Men's Discus Throw
 Luis Delís
 Qualification — 62.20 m
 Final — 66.32 m (→  Bronze Medal)
 José Santa Cruz
 Qualification — 60.14 m
 Final — 61.52 m (→ 10th place)

Men's Hammer Throw
Armando Orozco
 Qualification — 72.28 m
 Final Round — 68.68 m (→ 11th place)

Women's Shot Put
 María Elena Sarría
 Final — 19.37 m (→ 9th place)

Women's Discus Throw
 Carmen Romero
 Qualification — 58.60 m
 Final — 60.86 m (→ 10th place)
 María Cristina Betancourt
 Qualification — 57.62 m (→ did not advance)

Women's Javelin Throw
 María Caridad Colón
 Qualification — 62.42 m
 Final — 68.40 m (→  Gold Medal)

Basketball

Men's Team Competition
Preliminary Round (Group C)
 Defeated Australia (83-76)
 Defeated Sweden (71-59)
 Lost to Italy (72-79)
Semi Final Round (Group A)
 Lost to Brazil (93-94)
 Lost to Yugoslavia (84-112)
 Lost to Spain (95-96)
 Lost to Soviet Union (90-109) → 6th place
Team Roster:
 Jorge More
 Ruperto Herrera
 Alejandro Ortiz
 Noangel Luaces
 Generoso Márquez
 Raúl Duboy
 Pedro Abreu
 Miguel Calderón
 Tomás Herrera
 Daniel Scott
 Alejandro Urgelles
 Félix Morales

Women's Team Competition
Team Roster:
 Andrea Borrell
 Barbara Becquer  
 Caridad Despaigne 
 Inocenta Corvea   
 María de los Santos  
 María Moret   
 Matilde Charro   
 Nancy Atiez  
 Santa Margarita Skeet  
 Sonia de la Paz 
 Vicenta Salmon  
 Virginia Pérez

Boxing

Men's Light Flyweight (48 kg)
Hipólito Ramos →  Silver Medal
 First Round — Bye
 Second Round — Defeated Farid Salman Mahdi (Iraq) on points (5-0) 
 Quarter Finals — Defeated György Gedó (Hungary) on points (5-0) 
 Semi Finals — Defeated Ismail Mustafov (Bulgaria) on points (4-1) 
 Final — Lost to Shamil Sabirov (Soviet Union) on points (2-3)

Men's Flyweight (51 kg)
Jorge Hernández
 First Round — Bye
 Second Round — Lost to Viktor Miroshnichenko (Soviet Union) on points (1-4)

Men's Bantamweight (54 kg)
Juan Hernández →  Gold Medal
 First Round — Bye
 Second Round — Defeated Sándor Farkas (Hungary) on points (4-1) 
 Third Round — Defeated Ayele Mohammed (Ethiopia) after referee stopped contest in second round 
 Quarter Finals — Defeated Geraldi Issaick (Tanzania) after referee stopped contest in first round 
 Semi Finals — Defeated Michael Anthony (Guyana) on points (5-0)
 Final — Defeated Bernardo Piñango (Venezuela) on points (5-0)

Men's Featherweight (57 kg)
Adolfo Horta →  Silver Medal
 First Round — Bye
 Second Round — Defeated Odd Bengtsson (Sweden) on points (5-0)
 Third Round — Defeated Titi Cercel (Romania) on points (5-0)
 Quarter Finals — Defeated Luis Pizarro (Puerto Rico) on points (5-0)
 Semi Finals — Defeated Krzysztof Kosedowski (Poland) retired
 Final — Lost to Rudi Fink (East Germany) on points (1-4)

Men's Lightweight (60 kg)
Ángel Herrera →  Gold Medal
 First Round — Defeated Carlo Russolillo (Italy) on points (5-0)
 Second Round — Defeated Geza Tumbas (Yugoslavia) on points (5-0)
 Quarter Finals — Defeated Galsandorj Batbileg (Mongolia) on points (5-0)
 Semi Finals — Defeated Kazimierz Adach (Poland) on points (5-0)
 Final — Defeated Viktor Demyanenko (Soviet Union) after referee stopped contest in third round 

Men's Light-Welterweight (63,5 kg)
José Aguilar →  Bronze Medal
 First Round — Defeated Martin Brerton (Ireland) after referee stopped contest in first round
 Second Round — Defeated Ryu Bun-Hwa (North Korea) on points (4-1)
 Quarter Finals — Defeated Farouk Jawad (Iraq) after referee stopped contest in third round
 Semi Finals — Lost to Serik Konakbaev (Soviet Union) on points (1-4)

Men's Heavyweight (+ 81 kg)
Teófilo Stevenson →  Gold Medal
 First Round — Defeated Solomon Ataga (Nigeria) after knock-out in first round
 Quarter Finals — Defeated Grzegorz Skrzecz (Poland) after knock-out in third round
 Semi Finals — Defeated István Lévai (Hungary) on points (5-0) 
 Final — Defeated Piotr Zaev (Soviet Union) on points (4-1)

Canoeing

Cycling

Three cyclists represented Cuba in 1980.

Individual road race
 Gregorio Aldo Arencibia
 Carlos Cardet
 Antonio Quintero

Diving

Men's Springboard
Rolando Ruiz
 Preliminary Round — 489.24 points (→ did not advance)

Fencing

12 fencers, 8 men and 4 women, represented Cuba in 1980.

Men's foil
 Heriberto González
 Efigenio Favier
 Guillermo Betancourt

Men's team foil
 Efigenio Favier, Guillermo Betancourt, Heriberto González, Pedro Hernández

Men's épée
 Efigenio Favier
 Guillermo Betancourt
 Heriberto González

Men's team épée
 Efigenio Favier, Guillermo Betancourt, Heriberto González, Pedro Hernández

Men's sabre
 José Laverdecia
 Jesús Ortíz
 Manuel Ortíz

Men's team sabre
 Manuel Ortíz, Jesús Ortíz, José Laverdecia, Guzman Salazar

Women's foil
 Clara Alfonso
 Marlene Font
 Margarita Rodríguez

Women's team foil
 Margarita Rodríguez, Marlene Font, María Esther García, Clara Alfonso

Football

Men's Team Competition
Preliminary Round (Group A)
 Defeated Zambia (1-0)
 Defeated Venezuela (2-1)
 Lost to Soviet Union (0-8)
Quarter Finals
 Lost to Czechoslovakia (0-3)
Team Roster
 José Reinoso
 Miguel López
 Raimundo Frometa
 Luís Sanchez
 Luís Dreke
 Roberto Espinosa
 Andres Roldan
 Amado Povea
 Dagoberto Lara
 Ramon Núñez
 Luis Hernández
 Roberto Pereira
 Regino Delgado
 Jorge Masso
 Fermín Madera
 Carlos Loredo

Gymnastics

Handball

Men's Team Competition
Preliminary Round (Group A)
 Lost to Denmark (18-30)
 Lost to Poland (19-34)
 Lost to East Germany (20-27)
 Drew with Spain (24-24)
 Lost to Hungary (22-26)
Classification Match
 11th/12th place: Defeated Kuwait (32-24) → 11th place
Team Roster
 Pablo Pedroso
 Roberto Casuso
 Jesús Agramonte
 Miguel Izquierdo
 José Neninger
 Juan Llanes
 Juan Querol
 Juan Prendes
 Sabino Medina
 Roberto Zulueta
 Moisés Casales
 Ibrain Crombet
 Lázaro Jiménez
 Lázaro Pedroso

Hockey

Men's Team Competition
Preliminary Round
 Cuba — Poland 1-7
 Cuba — Soviet Union 2-11
 Cuba — Tanzania 4-0
 Cuba — India 0-13
 Cuba — Spain 0-11
Classification Match
 5th-6th place: Cuba — Tanzania 4-1 → 5th place
Team Roster:
 Ángel Mora
 Severo Frometa
 Bernabé Izquierdo
 Edgardo Vázquez
 Héctor Pedroso
 Tomás Varela
 Raúl García 
 Jorge Mico
 Rodolfo Delgado 
 Lazaro Hernández
 Juan Blanco 
 Juan Caballero 
 Roberto Ramírez 
 Ángel Fontane
 Ricardo Campos
 Juan Ríos

Judo

Men's Extra-Lightweight
José Rodríguez

Men's Half-Lightweight
Héctor Rodríguez

Men's Lightweight
Ricardo Tuero

Men's Half-Middleweight
Juan Ferrer

Men's Middleweight
Isaac Azcuy

Men's Half-Heavyweight
Rolando José Tornes

Rowing

Sailing

Shooting

Volleyball

Men's Team Competition
Preliminary Round (Group A)
 Defeated Italy (3-0)
 Lost to Bulgaria (1-3)
 Lost to Czechoslovakia (2-3)
 Lost to Soviet Union (0-3)
Classification Matches
 5th/8th place: Lost to Yugoslavia (2-3)
 7th/8th place: Defeated Czechoslovakia (3-1) → 7th place
Team Roster
 Diego Lapera
 Víctor García
 Luis Oviedo
 Ernesto Martínez
 Ricardo Leyva
 Jorge Garbey
 Raúl Vilches
 Carlos Salas
 Antonio Pérez
 Leonel Marshall Steward, Sr.
 Carlos Ruiz
 José David

Women's Team Competition
Preliminary Round (Group A)
 Lost to East Germany (1-3)
 Defeated Peru (3-0)
 Lost to Soviet Union (0-3)
Classification Match
 5th/6th place: Defeated Peru (3-1) → 5th place
Team Roster
 Mercedes Pérez
 Imilsis Téllez
 Ana Díaz
 Mercedes Pomares
 Mavis Guilarte
 Libertad González
 Erenia Díaz
 Maura Alfonso
 Josefina Capote
 Nelly Barnet
 Ana María García
 Lucila Urgelles

Water polo

Men's Team Competition
Preliminary Round (Group C)
 Drew with Yugoslavia (6-6)
 Defeated Australia (6-4)
 Defeated Bulgaria (7-1)
Final Round (Group A)
 Drew with Yugoslavia (7-7)
 Drew with Netherlands (7-7)
 Lost to Soviet Union (5-8)
 Lost to Hungary (5-7)
 Lost to Spain (7-9) → 5th place
Team Roster
 Oscar Periche
 Orlando Cowley
 Bárbaro Díaz
 Lazaro Costa
 Pedro Rodríguez
 Nelson Domínguez
 Jorge Rizo
 Arturo Ramos
 Carlos Benítez
 Gerardo Rodríguez
 Oriel Domínguez

Weightlifting

Wrestling

References

Nations at the 1980 Summer Olympics
1980 Summer Olympics
Olympics